Lukáš Kutra (born 5 August 1991) is a Czech football midfielder.

Club career 
In 2013, he came to Nitra. He made his debut for Nitra against AS Trenčín on 30 March 2013.

External links 
 Corgoň Liga profile
 
 Prosports profile

References

1991 births
Living people
Association football midfielders
Czech footballers
Czech Republic youth international footballers
FC Fastav Zlín players
FC Nitra players
Slovak Super Liga players
Expatriate footballers in Slovakia
Czech expatriate sportspeople in Slovakia